Celaenopsidae is a family of mites in the order Mesostigmata.

Species
Celaenopsidae contains seven genera, with fourteen recognized species:

 Genus Schizocyrtillus Kinn, 1970
 Schizocyrtillus josefinae Gwiazdowicz, 2002
 Schizocyrtillus lathrus Kinn, 1970
 Schizocyrtillus rarus Khaustov, 2000
 Genus Brachycelaenopsis Trägårdh, 1951
 Brachycelaenopsis breviatus (Banks, 1916)
 Genus Celaenopsis Berlese, 1886
 Celaenopsis andreinii Berlese, 1910
 Celaenopsis badius (C.L. Koch, 1839)
 Celaenopsis cuspidatus (Kramer, 1876)
 Celaenopsis xinjiangensis Ma & Ye, in Ma, Liu & Ye 2003
 Genus Antennocelaeno Berlese, 1903
 Antennocelaeno braunsi Wasman, 1902
 Genus Neocelaeno Berlese, 1910
 Neocelaeno crytodonta (Berlese, 1901)
 Genus Pleuronectocelaeno Vitzthum, 1926
 Pleuronectocelaeno austriaca Vitzthum, 1926
 Pleuronectocelaeno barbara Athias Henriot, 1959
 Pleuronectocelaeno japonica Kinn, 1991
 Genus Dinocelaeno Oudemans, 1936
 Dinocelaeno gigas (Dugès, 1824)

References

Mesostigmata
Acari families